Trofimuk Institute of Petroleum-Gas Geology and Geophysics of the Siberian Branch of the RAS, IPGG SB RAS is a research institute in Novosibirsk, Russia. It was founded in 2005.

History
The Institute was formed in 2005 by merging the Institute of Geophysics SB RAS, Institute of Petroleum Geology SB RAS and Design and Technological Institute of Instruments for Geophysics and Ecology SB RAS.

Activity
The Institute has created two devices: EMS Nemfis and Geoviser which collected information about changes in the electrical resistivity of the study area. The instruments can detect disappeared ancient settlements.

References

Research institutes in Novosibirsk
Research institutes established in 2005
Geology organizations